Guy Pierre Bordelon Jr. (February 1, 1922 – December 19, 2002) was a United States Navy flying ace during the Korean War, shooting down five enemy aircraft. Bordelon was the only U.S. Navy aviator to become an ace in the war.

In addition to being the Korean War's only navy ace, he was the only night ace and the only American ace to do so flying a piston engined aircraft, the F4U Corsair.  
Bordelon, nicknamed "Lucky Pierre", was credited with three Lavochkin La-9s or La-11s, and two Yak-18s between 29 June and 16/17 July 1952.

Bordelon became an instructor after Korea, and taught survival training to pilots during the Vietnam War. He was also chosen for the prestigious Top Gun award. Guy Bordelon retired as a commander after 27 years in the U.S. Navy, returning to his home town of Ruston, Louisiana. He died in 2002 at the age of 80, and was buried in the family plot in Greenwood Cemetery, in Ruston.

See also
List of Korean War flying aces
List of Navy Cross recipients for the Korean War

References

Sources

1922 births
2002 deaths
American Korean War flying aces
United States Navy personnel of the Korean War
Military personnel from Louisiana
People from Ruston, Louisiana
Recipients of the Navy Cross (United States)
Recipients of the Silver Star
United States Navy officers
United States Navy pilots of World War II